The 2012 Southampton Council election took place on Thursday 3 May 2012 to elect members of Southampton City Council in Hampshire, England. One third of the council (16 seats) was scheduled for election, whilst two additional vacancies, caused by the resignation of sitting councillors, were also filled in Bitterne Park and Peartree wards, meaning a total of 18 of the city's 48 seats were elected.

The ruling Conservative party had come under intense public scrutiny for their sweeping programme of privatisation of council services and implementing pay cuts to council jobs, which led to union disputes. Labour won a majority of the seats being contested, and also gained overall control of the council from the Conservatives.

Election result
This summary box compares each party vote share with the corresponding elections in 2008, the last elections at which the majority of this tranche of seats were elected.

Changes in council composition

After the election, the composition of the council was:

Ward results

References

2012 English local elections
2012
2010s in Southampton